David Legeno (12 October 1963 – 6 July 2014) was a British actor, mixed martial artist, professional wrestler & well respected bouncer of London nightclubs

Life and career
Legeno was born David Steven Murray in Marylebone, London, England. 

Legeno's first major film role was in Guy Ritchie's Snatch. He had roles in Batman Begins, Elizabeth: The Golden Age,  Centurion, and Last Knights. Most notably, Legeno played the werewolf Fenrir Greyback in Harry Potter and the Half-Blood Prince, Harry Potter and the Deathly Hallows – Part 1, and Part 2.

Legeno voiced and motion-captured for the videogame The Getaway: Black Monday as a protagonist, Eddie O'Connor. He was trained in various combat styles, including boxing, wrestling, judo, Brazilian Jiu-Jitsu, and Muay Thai.

Also was a professional wrestler as Lone Wolf for British Wrestling Federation from 1991 to 1992.

Death
Legeno's body was found by a pair of hikers on 6 July 2014 in Death Valley, California, United States. Due to the remote area, a helicopter was called in to retrieve his remains. Legeno died of heat-related health problems and may have been dead for three to four days before his body was discovered. No foul play was suspected.

A memorial evening took place in London on 12 October 2014, which would have been Legeno's 51st birthday. It was held at Camden Underworld, the venue where Legeno had held his album launch in 2004. The memorial was attended by fellow cast members of Harry Potter and Snatch, as well as by friends from the mixed martial arts community and music industry. Actors Tom Felton and Nick Moran and Cage Rage founder, Dave O'Donnell, spoke about Legeno, and his favourite songs were performed live.

The film Last Knights was dedicated to his honour.

Filmography

Mixed martial arts record

|-
| Win
| align=center| 4–3
| Herb Dean
| TKO (eye injury)
| Cage Rage 22
| 
| align=center| 1
| align=center| 5:00
| London, England
| 
|-
| Win
| align=center| 3–3
| Dan Severn
| Decision (unanimous)
| Cage Rage 20
| 
| align=center| 3
| align=center| 5:00
| London, England
| 
|-
| Win
| align=center| 2–3
| Alan Murdock
| Submission (rear-naked choke)
| Cage Rage 19
| 
| align=center| 1
| align=center| 4:10
| London, England
| 
|-
| Win
| align=center| 1–3
| Kimo Leopoldo
| Submission (guillotine choke)
| Cage Rage 18
| 
| align=center| 1
| align=center| 3:21
| London, England
| 
|-
| Loss
| align=center| 0–3
| Mark Epstein
| KO (punches)
| Cage Rage 17
| 
| align=center| 1
| align=center| 0:45
| London, England
| 
|-
| Loss
| align=center| 0–2
| Ikuhisa Minowa
| Submission (achilles lock)
| Cage Rage 15
| 
| align=center| 1
| align=center| 2:21
| London, England
| 
|-
| Loss
| align=center| 0–1
| Alan Murdock
| Submission (armbar)
| Cage Rage 14
| 
| align=center| 1
| align=center| 4:07
| London, England
|

References

External links

 

1963 births
2014 deaths
Date of death unknown
20th-century English male actors
21st-century English male actors
Accidental deaths in California
Deaths from hyperthermia
English male television actors
English male mixed martial artists
English male film actors
Male actors from London
Light heavyweight mixed martial artists
Heavyweight mixed martial artists
People educated at Dr Challoner's Grammar School
People from Marylebone